Fred Earl Norris Jr. (April 11, 1923 - November 9, 2006) was an American Mid-Century Modern architect, with a degree in architecture from University of California, Berkeley, who designed more than 250 homes on individual sites throughout Southern California from the mid-1950s through 1998 when he retired to Maui Hawaii.  Notable Norris projects include designing and developing "Hollywood Park" in 1959 at North Pacific Beach, San Diego—-an enclave of 13 mid-century homes; the residence of G.G. (Gilbert George) Budwig, aviation pioneer and early Director of Air Regulation for the U.S. Department of Commerce; and the Robert Martinet residence (former San Diego City Councilman). Both residences are located on Mission Bay, San Diego County and were featured in the Los Angeles Times when first built. In addition to numerous residential projects and a few commercial designs, Norris is credited with the design and supervision of the 1988 construction of the seawall on Ka'anapali Beach, Maui, located in front of the Maui Kai condo resort and known as the Fred Norris Seawall. A bronze plaque with his name is attached to the seawall.

Partial Listing of Projects
 Fred Norris Residence, 6336 La Jolla Boulevard, La Jolla (1952)
 G.G. Budwig Residence, Mission Bay (1958)
 Robert Martinet Residence, 1069 E. Briarfield Drive, San Diego (1960)
 Gene Littler Residence, Los Morros, Rancho Santa Fe
 "Hollywood Park"
1210, 1218, 1230, 1234, 1242, 1248 and 1254 Turquoise Street; 1211, 1217, 1223, 1233 and 1237 Agate Street; 5210 Cardeno Drive, San Diego (1959-1960) 
 375 Via del Norte, La Jolla (1954)
 Peck Buick Dealership, Midway District, San Diego
 Coberly Ford Dealership, Burbank

References

University of California, Berkeley alumni
Architects from California
1923 births
2006 deaths